The Daat Island is an island in Labuan, Malaysia.

History
In 1856, Labuan Governor George Warren Edwardes issued a grant to John Gavaron Treacher dan Clarence Cooper to be the owner of the island. Since then, the island has been owned by several different people. In 2019, 17 ship passengers were stranded on the island en route to Labuan. On 30 June 2021, the island was planned to be put into auction, but it was rescheduled to 10 September 2021. It was the rescheduled again on 27 May 2022. The island auction reserved price was MYR121.5 million.

Geography
The island spans over an area of 2.4 km2.

See also
 List of islands of Malaysia

References

Labuan
Islands of Malaysia